Kirsten Flower (born August 14, 1988) is an American former professional tennis player.

A native of Columbus, Ohio, Flower was a member of Georgia Tech's 2007 NCAA Division I championship team. Her final two seasons of collegiate tennis were with Ohio State University and she was team captain as a senior.

Flower made her only WTA Tour singles main draw appearance as a wildcard in Cincinnati in 2007.

ITF finals

Doubles: 3 (0–3)

References

External links
 
 

1988 births
Living people
American female tennis players
Georgia Tech Yellow Jackets women's tennis players
Ohio State Buckeyes women's tennis players
Tennis people from Ohio
Sportspeople from Columbus, Ohio